Sikh Village earlier known as Sikhul thota is a small suburb in Secunderabad, India. The name is attributed to some of the Nizam's Sikh troops being settled here a century ago.

Landmarks

The Tadbund Hanuman temple is located here. Also it is the place where the Indian hockey players Mukesh Kumar and Saranjeet Singh live. Old Mudfort, an area earlier named as Tilleri is also very near. Sikh Village is also house to the Dobhi ghat that was given to local washer man community by British to wash soiled clothes here by not going to Hasmathpet lake.

Masthana Hotel is an age-old landmark of Sikh Village and Mudfort. It is close to Trimulgherry, Park View Enclave and the AWHO housing colony. There is a Gurudwara in the vicinity. The key circle areas are Diamond Point Circle, Mastana Hotel Cross. The Diamond Point Hotel is also there in the area.

It has a number of function halls like Imperial Gardens, Jewel Gardens, Bantia Gardens, and Raja Rajeshwari Gardens. A hockey ground is planned in the area.

The wholesale Monda Market which was moved from Secunderabad is located here.

The landscape of Sikh Village was entirely lush green fields of fruits and vegetables, hence the name thota.

Transport
TSRTC 26,26N,26M,26G 26M/V all connect Sikh Village to Secunderabad and other parts of the city.

The closest MMTS Train station is at Secunderabad

Schools
There are several schools in this suburb, including Delhi Public School, Sun Flower School, Sarjus Preschool, and GGS.

References

Neighbourhoods in Hyderabad, India